This is a list of castles and chateaux located in the Liberec Region of the Czech Republic.

A
 Arthurův hrad Castle

B
 Berštejn Castle
 Bezděz Castle
 Bredovský letohrádek Chateau

C
 Chudý hrádek Castle
 Čap Castle
 Čertova ruka Castle

D
 Děvín Castle
 Doksy Chateau
 Dolánky Castle
 Dolní Štěpanice Castle
 Drábovna Castle
 Dubá Castle

F
 Falkenburk Castle
 Frýdlant Chateau
 Frýdštejn Castle

G
 Grabštejn Castle

H
 Hamrštejn Castle
 Horní Branná Chateau
 Horní Libchava Chateau
 Horní Police Chateau
 Houska Castle
 Hrad u Hostíkovic Castle
 Hrad u Hvězdy Castle
 Hrad u Kluku (Dražejova) Castle
 Hrad u Kvítkova Castle
 Hrad u Velenic Castle
 Hrubá Skála Chateau
 Hrubý Rohozec Chateau
 Hřídelík Castle
 Hrádek nad Nisou Castle

J
 Jesenný Chateau
 Jestřebí Castle
 Jezdec Castle
 Jilemnice Chateau
 Jiljov Castle

K
 Kavčiny Castle
 Klinštejn Castle
 Konvalinkový vrch Castle
 Košťálov Castle
 Kozlov Castle
 Krompach Chateau
 Křída Castle
 Kvítkov Castle

L
 Lemberk Chateau
 Levín Castle
 Lipý Castle
 Lomnice nad Popelkou Chateau
 Loubí Castle
 Loupežnický vrch Castle

M
 Malá Skála Chateau
 Malý Rohozec Chateau
 Milčany Castle
 Milštejn Castle
 Mimoň Castle
 Myšlín Castle

N
 Návarov Castle
 Návarov Chateau
 Nebákov Castle
 Nístějka Castle
 Nová Louka Chateau
 Nový Berštejn Chateau
 Nový Falkenburg Chateau

P
 Pachtovský zámeček Chateau
 Pihel Castle

R
 Ralsko Castle
 Roimund Castle
 Ronov Castle
 Rotštejn Castle
 Rousínovský hrádek Castle

S

 Skalní hrad Castle
 Sloup Castle
 Sloup Chateau
 Smržovka Chateau
 Starý Berštejn Castle
 Stohánek Castle
 Studenec Chateau
 Stvolínky Chateau
 Svijany Chateau
 Svojkov Castle
 Sychrov Chateau

T
 Tlustec Chateau
 Trosky Castle

V
 Valdštejn Castle
 Vartemberk Chateau
 Velenice Castle
 Velký Valtinov Chateau
 Velký Valtinov Chateau
 Vítkovec Chateau
 Vranov Castle
 Vřísek Castle

Z
 Zahrádky - letohrádek Chateau
 Zahrádky Castle
 Zahrádky Chateau
 Zakšín Castle
 Zákupy Chateau
 Zámecký vrch Castle
 Zbirohy Castle
 Zbyny Castle
 Zkamenělý zámek - Hrad u Konrádova Castle
 Žacléř Chateau

See also
 List of castles in the Czech Republic
 List of castles in Europe
 List of castles

External links 
 Castles, Chateaux, and Ruins 
 Czech Republic - Manors, Castles, Historical Towns
 Hrady.cz 

 
Liberec